Supriya Jatav (born on 20 October 1991) is an Indian Karateka. She was born in Dahod, Gujarat, India. Her mother Meena Jatav and father Amar Singh Jatav is a retired army officer. She is presently coached under the guidance of Jaidev Sharma. From 2002 to 2006, she was coached and had played under the banner of Sports Authority of India. She presently represents and works with the Department of Sports and Youth Welfare, Government of Madhya Pradesh.

She is Kumite Karate athlete from India to achieve a medal in the three consecutive Commonwealth Karate Championships in Kumite Event. She is the first Indian to win the US Open Karate Championship in the elite division in 2019. Supriya Jatav won the national championship since 2010 till 2020. She has won the highest state awards for sports from Gujarat and Madhya Pradesh.

Awards and recognition

International and World Championships

Commonwealth Karate Championship

Asian Championship

South Asian Championship

References

Indian female karateka
Sportspeople from Ahmedabad
1991 births
Living people
Indian female martial artists
Sportswomen from Gujarat
21st-century Indian women
21st-century Indian people
Sportspeople from Gujarat